Michael Plunkett is a Gaelic footballer who plays for Ballintubber and at senior level for the Mayo county team.

References

Living people
Gaelic football backs
Mayo inter-county Gaelic footballers
Year of birth missing (living people)